Royal City may refer to:
 Royal city in Polish–Lithuanian Commonwealth, a historical type of cities
 Royal City (band), a music group from Guelph, Ontario
 Royal City Curling Club, based in New Westminster, British Columbia
 Royal cities, a historic title of Czech cities and towns

Places 
 Royal City, Washington, United States
 The literal translation for Ciudad Real, Spain
 The literal translation for Wangcheng (Zhou dynasty) in China
 The title for Klang (City), Malaysia

As a nickname
 New Westminster, British Columbia, Canada
 Guelph, Ontario, Canada
 Kansas City, Missouri, United States

Other uses
 Royal City (album)
 Royal City (comic by Jeff Lemire)

See also 
 Royal town (disambiguation)